Lynn Taylor (born 16 June 1938) is an English and Australian actress, singer and dancer.

Life and career
Taylor was born in the UK. She began her stage career with the Manchester Repertory Theatre, and studied at the Royal College of Music for one year.

In England, she worked in TV series such as "The Saint", "The Avengers" and "Danger Man" and was also Elizabeth Taylor’s stand-in in the movie Cleopatra. In October 1964, she moved to Sydney to launch a new TV career. Besides Australian TV series and stage productions, she co-anchored live TV talk shows and featured on TV commercials.

Taylor was an international promotional representative for Elizabeth Arden, Inc. She taught at National Institute of Dramatic Art.

Personal life
Lynn married Sydney businessman in the mid-1950s. They had three sons. She had a daughter with her second husband, TV and theatre producer, actor and writer John Faassen.

Performances

Television

Stage

References

External links
 

1938 births
Living people
English television actresses
Australian television actresses
20th-century English actresses
20th-century Australian actresses
21st-century Australian women
21st-century Australian people